Roxborough v Rothmans of Pall Mall Australia Ltd is an Australian unjust enrichment law case, concerning to what extent enrichment of the defendant must be at the expense of the claimant.

Facts
Mr Roxborough sought to recover a tobacco licence fee from Rothmans Ltd. That was required to be paid by the Business Franchise Licences (Tobacco) Act 1987 (NSW) and was struck down by the High Court of Australia because it was held to be an excise, which only the Federal Government could charge. This left the wholesaler with a windfall, paid to it that were then going to go onto the State government. It had been found that the retailers had already passed on the fees to their customers.

Judgment
The High Court by a majority rejected the defence of passing on. Gleeson CJ, Gaudron J and Hayne J held there was no reason to depart from that view which was expressed in Commissioner of State Revenue (Vic) v Royal Insurance Australia Ltd.

Kirby J dissented and held that the defence should be allowed.

See also

English unjust enrichment law

References

English unjust enrichment case law
High Court of Australia cases
2001 in case law
2001 in Australian law